Japan first participated at the Olympic Games in 1912, and has competed at almost every Games since then. The nation was not invited to the 1948 Games after World War II, and was part of the American-led boycott of the 1980 Summer Olympics in Moscow.

Japan won its first medals in 1920, and its first gold medals in 1928. Japanese athletes have won 497 medals at the Summer Olympic Games (except art competitions), with the most gold medals won in judo, Skateboarding and Karate,as of the end of 2020 Summer Olympics. Japan has also won 58 medals at the Winter Olympic Games. Its most successful Olympics are the 1964 and 2020 Games, both hosted in Tokyo. 

The Japanese Olympic Committee was created in 1911 and recognized in 1912.

Hosted Games
Japan have hosted the Games on four occasions, including the 2020 Summer Olympics (which was postponed to 2021 due to the COVID-19 pandemic):

Cancelled games

Unsuccessful bids

Medal tables

Medals by Summer Games

Medals by Winter Games

Medals by summer sport

Medals by winter sport

Youth Games medal tables

Medals by Summer Youth Games

Medals by Winter Youth Games

Medals by summer sport

Medals by winter sport

Hosted Olympics mottos

1964 Summer Olympics
The 1964 Summer Olympics marks Japan host its first Olympic Games. It was held in the capital Tokyo. It was also the first time it was held in Asia.

1972 Winter Olympics
The 1972 Winter Olympics marks the second time Olympics held in Japan. It was the first time held outside Tokyo because it was held at Sapporo.

Because of its snowy geographic, Japan would hosts its first Winter Olympics. It was also the first winter olympics held in Asia.

1998 Winter Olympics
The 1998 Winter Olympics was the third time Japan hosts Olympics for third time and Winter in second. Was held at Nagano. The motto of the games is Coexistence with Nature (自然との共存)

2020 Summer Olympics
The 2020 Summer Olympics marks the fourth time Olympics held in Japan. It was the first time it was held one year late (2021 instead of 2020) following the worldwide COVID-19 pandemic. It marks the second time it was held in Tokyo. Its motto was United by Emotion (感動で、私たちはひとつになる). During that time, only the English version was used.

This motto appeals that "Sports enable us to overcome different environments and become one world through emotions such as joy and excitement that the athletes' competitive performances bring together in our hearts."

See also
List of flag bearers for Japan at the Olympics
:Category:Olympic competitors for Japan
Japan at the Paralympics
Japan at the Asian Games

References

External links